Curl Moncton Inc. is a curling club in Moncton, New Brunswick.

History
Curl Moncton traces its history back to the founding of the Moncton Curling Association (MCA) in 1881, and was located on Lower Lutz Street. The club was moved to Mechanic Street in 1903, but was destroyed in a fire in 1915. The club was then rebuilt on Lutz Street.

Curl Moncton itself was formed in 2011 when the Beaver Curling Club and the Curling Beauséjour merged. The MCA joined Curl Moncton in 2013, when Curl Moncton purchased its site on Lutz Street to gain access to equity.  The move was controversial, as it involved evicting the Humanity Project, which had been using the facility to help house and feed the homeless population.  Using the equity from the sale, the club was expanded from five sheets to ten in 2019 at the cost of $2.7 million. The City of Moncton granted $66,000 to the club to keep afloat during the COVID-19 pandemic. In 2022, the club only put in five sheets of ice, renting the other half of the ice shed to the Greater Moncton Pickeball Association.

The Beaver Curling Club was founded in 1946 by a number of members for the MCA, becoming the city's second curling club. The Beauséjour Curling Club (later renamed Curling Beauséjour) was built in 1957, planned by the Le Cercle Acadien organization. Discussions began to merge the clubs in 2009.

Provincial champions
Teams from Moncton clubs have won the following men's and women's provincial championships:

Men's
Winners of the New Brunswick Tankard:

Women's
Winners of the New Brunswick Scotties Tournament of Hearts:

National champions
Teams from Moncton clubs have won the following national championships:

References

Curling clubs in Canada
Sports venues in Moncton
Sports clubs established in 1881
1881 establishments in New Brunswick
Curling in New Brunswick